Chifley can refer to:

 Ben Chifley, Prime Minister of Australia from 1945 to 1949
 Chifley, Australian Capital Territory, a suburb of Canberra named after him
 Chifley, New South Wales, a suburb of Sydney
 Division of Chifley, an outer suburban Sydney electorate in the Australian House of Representatives, also named after Chifley